Samachar (Hindi for "information") was founded in February 1976, after the merger of United News of India, Press Trust of India, Samachar Bharati and Hindustan Samachar.     The news agency was directly under the control of the government of India.

Background
During the period of emergency, on 26 July 1975, government of India took the decision to merge the four teleprinter news agencies of India and form a single nationalised news agency. The employees' unions of the four agencies supported the idea. Hence in February 1976, United News of India, PTI, Hindustan Samachar and Samachar Bharati were merged to form a single news agency, Samachar.

After the defeat of Indira Gandhi's government in 1977 election, Kuldip Nayar Committee was formed to examine the structure of Samachar as news agency.

On 14 November 1977, the committee recommended the independence of the four news agency as they were before the emergency period.

Thus, on 14 April 1978, all four news agencies split from Samachar, and Samachar became the news portal of Government of India.

References

Bibliography

News agencies based in India
Mass media companies established in 1976
1976 establishments in India